Poisonblack is a Finnish gothic metal band led by singer and guitarist Ville Laihiala.

History 
In 2003, the band's first album, Escapexstacy, was on the Finnish national charts for three weeks, peaking at No. 21. They opened for Iron Maiden at the Hartwall Areena in Helsinki on 21 December 2003 for the Dance of Death World Tour.

Singer Juha-Pekka Leppäluoto left in the autumn of 2003 to concentrate on his work with Charon. Ville Laihiala, the band's principal songwriter, assumed vocal duties and has since led Poisonblack out of the gothic genre of their first album and in a musical direction that closely mirrors that of his former band Sentenced.

In 2006, the band toured Europe with Lacuna Coil and their second album, Lust Stained Despair, reached No. 2 in Finland for one week.

In 2008, they released A Dead Heavy Day which hit the Finnish Album Chart in position 6. After this success, they toured Europe with Dark Tranquillity and Fear My Thoughts. In 2010, Poisonblack released Of Rust and Bones, their fourth album. The fifth album, Drive, was released in 2011 on Hype Records and the band's latest album, Lyijy, was released in September 2013 by Warner Music Finland. The album reached No. 4 on the Finnish album chart.

On 23 August 2015, singer Ville Laihiala posted a statement on the band's Facebook page and website stating that the band had broken up. The band played their final show at Oulu, Finland (21-08-2015). JP Leppäluoto joined the band in their final few shows. The final song the band would ever perform would be "The State", before ending their farewell show and tour.

On February 27th 2023, JP Leppäluoto announced on his Instagram page that Poisonblack is coming back to play some shows for Escapexstacy's 20th anniversary. Poisonblack's Facebook also announced the reunion the same day.

Band members 
 Ville Laihiala – vocals (2003–2015), guitars (2000–2015)
 Antti Remes – bass (2004–2015)
 Marco Sneck – keyboards (2000–2015)
 Tarmo Kanerva – drums (2000–2015)

Former members 
 Juha-Pekka Leppäluoto – vocals (2001–2003, 2015)
 Janne Dahlgren – guitars (2000–2003)
 Janne Markus – guitars (2004–2010)
 Janne Kukkonen – bass (2000–2004)

Tour members 
 Veli-Matti Kananen – keyboards (2008)
 Antti Leiviskä – guitars (2010–2015)

Timeline

Discography

Albums 
Escapexstacy (2003)
Lust Stained Despair (2006)
A Dead Heavy Day (2008)
Of Rust and Bones (2010)
Drive (2011)
Lyijy (2013)

Video albums 
A Dead Heavy Day (DVD) (2008)

Singles 
"Love Infernal" (2003)
"Rush" (2006)
"Bear the Cross" (2008)
"Mercury Falling" (2011)
"Scars" (2011)
"Home Is Where the Sty Is" (2013)
"Down the Ashes Rain" (2014)

Compilation 
 Classics (2009)

References

External links 

 Interview with Ville Laihiala "Music Is My Savior In So Many Ways" February 9, 2010
 Hype Records

Finnish gothic metal musical groups
Finnish heavy metal musical groups
Finnish hard rock musical groups
Finnish gothic rock groups
Musical groups established in 2000